James Henry Johnson (1874 – 15 November 1921) was a British pair skater competitive during the early days of modern figure skating. He and partner Phyllis Johnson won the silver medal at the 1908 Summer Olympics, the first Olympics to include figure skating events.

The Johnsons also participated in the first official World Figure Skating Championships pairs' competition, placing second behind Anna Hübler and Heinrich Burger of Germany. The Johnsons finished first in 1909, third in 1910, and first again in 1912.

Results
(with Phyllis Johnson)

References

1874 births
1921 deaths
British male pair skaters
Figure skaters at the 1908 Summer Olympics
Olympic figure skaters of Great Britain
Olympic silver medallists for Great Britain
Olympic medalists in figure skating
World Figure Skating Championships medalists
Medalists at the 1908 Summer Olympics